En Vazhi Thani Vazhi may refer to:

 En Vazhi Thani Vazhi (1988 film)
 En Vazhi Thani Vazhi (2015 film)